Maharajapuram Viswanatha Iyer (1896–1970) was one of the great Indian Carnatic vocalists. He won several awards including Sangeetha Kalanidhi and Sangeetha Bhupathy.

Early life and background
Viswanatha Iyer was born in Maharajapuram to Rama Iyer, a singer.

He was trained initially by Umayalpuram Swaminatha Iyer, a direct disciple of Maha Vaidyanatha Iyer. Maha Vaidyanatha Iyer had learnt from a direct disciple of Tyagaraja and thus Viswanatha Iyer represents the fifth generation of the Tyagaraja School.

Palghat Rama Bhagavathar was a fellow student under Umayalpuram Swaminatha Iyer.

Singing career
A unique feature about his music was his great success in raga elaboration in great detail. The raga alapana of Mohanam was one of his specialties. His has been hailed as the success of 'kalpana sangeetha', music rich with imagination in raga elaboration and swara singing, a specialty of his.

His prominent disciples include Semmangudi Srinivasa Iyer, Mannargudi Sambasiva Bhagavatar, and his own son Maharajapuram Santhanam.

Film career
He acted in a Tamil movie "Bhaktha Nandhanar" released on 1 January 1935 as the landlord Vedhiyar. K.B. Sundarambal acted as Nandhanar in this movie.

References

Male Carnatic singers
Carnatic singers
1896 births
1970 deaths
People from Thanjavur district
Sangeetha Kalanidhi recipients
20th-century Indian male classical singers
Singers from Tamil Nadu
Recipients of the Sangeet Natak Akademi Award